Los Valles is a corregimiento in Cañazas District, Veraguas Province, Panama with a population of 1,200 as of 2010. Its population as of 1990 was 2,045; its population as of 2000 was 1,245.

References

Corregimientos of Veraguas Province